Bezgarji is a small settlement in the Municipality of Osilnica in southern Slovenia. It lies in the traditional region of Lower Carniola and is now included in the Southeast Slovenia Statistical Region.

References

External links
Bezgarji on Geopedia

Populated places in the Municipality of Osilnica